Rockaway Avenue is a street located in Brooklyn, New York. It is also the name of two current New York City Subway stations and one closed station:

Rockaway Avenue (IND Fulton Street Line), serving the  trains
Rockaway Avenue (IRT New Lots Line), serving the  trains
Rockaway Avenue (BMT Fulton Street Line), the former elevated station; now demolished